Following is a list of senators of French Guiana, people who have represented the department of French Guiana in the Senate of France.

Fourth Republic

Senators for French Guiana under the French Fourth Republic were:

Fifth Republic 
Senators for French Guiana under the French Fifth Republic were:

References

Sources

 
Lists of members of the Senate (France) by department